Abdel Azim Ashry (October 31, 1911, in Egypt – March 2, 1997, in Egypt) was an Egyptian basketball player, referee and sports administrator. In 1985, he was a recipient of the Silver Olympic Order.

Career
Ashry played in the Egyptian first division basketball league in the 1930s and 1940s. Upon retiring, he became a referee, calling in the 1948 Olympic Games (including the USA-France final), 1950 World Championship (including the Argentina-USA final), 1952 Olympic Games (including the USA-USSR final) and 1954 World Championship (including the USA-Brazil final). Subsequently, he served as the president of the Egyptian Basketball Federation in 1972-1985, the president of the Egyptian Olympic Committee in 1978-1985 and secretary general of AFABA (currently FIBA Africa) in 1965-1997. In 1997, he was awarded the FIBA Order of Merit. He was enshrined in the FIBA Hall of Fame in 2007 as a contributor.

References

External links
 FIBA Hall of Fame page on Ashry

1911 births
1997 deaths
Egyptian men's basketball players
FIBA Hall of Fame inductees
Basketball in Egypt
Recipients of the Olympic Order